The XI Fighter Command was a command of the United States Army Air Forces. It was assigned to Eleventh Air Force, stationed at Adak Army Airfield, Alaska. 

The command controlled fighter units in Alaska during the World War II Aleutian Islands Campaign under Eleventh Air Force. It was activated in March 1942 and inactivated on 31 March 1944.

Lineage
 Constituted as the 11th Interceptor Command on 8 March 1942 
 Activated in Alaska on 15 March 1942
 Redesignated 11th Fighter Command on 15 May 1942
 Redesignated XI Fighter Command c. 18 September 1942
 Disbanded in Alaska on 31 March 1944

Assignments
 Eleventh Air Force, 15 March 1942 – 31 March 1944

Stations
 Elmendorf Field, Alaska, 15 March 1942
 Adak Army Airfield, Alaska, 12 September 1943 – 31 March 1944

Components
 Group
 343d Fighter Group: 15 March 1942 – 31 March 1944

 Squadrons
 11th Fighter Squadron: 7 June – 11 September 1942
 18th Fighter Squadron: 7 June – 11 September 1942
 54th Fighter Squadron: 31 May – 11 September 1942

References

Notes
 Explanatory notes

 Citations

Bibliography

 
 

11 Command Fighter
Military units and formations disestablished in 1944